Sara McMann (born September 24, 1980) is an American female mixed martial artist currently signed to Bellator MMA, competing in the Women's Featherweight division. McMann is a former Olympic wrestler and received a silver medal at the 2004 Summer Olympics in Athens, Greece and was a  World Silver Medalist and 2-time Bronze Medalist. She would then transition to MMA, most notably competing in the bantamweight division of the  Ultimate Fighting Championship (UFC)

Wrestling 

McMann started wrestling at the age of 14 in Marion, North Carolina at McDowell High School. She is the first American woman in history to receive a silver medal in Olympic wrestling, which she won at the 2004 Summer Olympics in Athens, Greece. McMann won silver medal in the 2003 world championships and a bronze medal in the 2005 and 2007 world championships n the Women's Freestyle 63 kg or 138.75 lb weight class.

In 2022, McMann was inducted to the National Wrestling Hall of Fame as a Distinguished Member.

Mixed martial arts career
McMann announced in late 2010 that she had signed a three-fight contract with Strikeforce. She planned to fight at 135 pounds. However, she did not sign on with the promotion due to an extension clause in the contract.

McMann was first scheduled to make her professional mixed martial arts debut on November 14, 2010 in Jamaica, but the event was cancelled due to safety problems with the cage.

She then had more fights fall apart after opponents backed out, including a scheduled April 30, 2011 fight against Mariah Johnson.

On May 28, 2011, McMann made her pro MMA debut at Universal Cage Combat: Revolution. She defeated Christina Marks by submission in the first round.

McMann faced fellow Olympian Julie Malenfant at Blackeye Promotions 4 on June 17, 2011. McMann defeated Malenfant by TKO early in the first round.

McMann faced Tonya Evinger at Titan Fighting Championships 19 on July 29, 2011. The fight served as the co-main event. McMann defeated Evinger by unanimous decision.

ProElite
After ProElite reincarnated under new management, McMann faced Raquel Pa'aluhi on the promotion's first event post-EliteXC at ProElite 1: Arlovski vs. Lopez on August 27, 2011. She defeated Pa'aluhi by submission due to an americana in the third round.

McMann returned to ProElite to face Hitomi Akano at ProElite 3 on January 21, 2012. She defeated Akano by unanimous decision.

Invicta Fighting Championships
On April 28, it was announced that McMann would face Shayna Baszler in the main event of Invicta Fighting Championships 2. The event took place on July 28, 2012. McMann defeated Baszler via unanimous decision and the bout was named fight of the night. The bout was a title eliminator, with the winner scheduled to face the winner of Alexis Davis vs. Hitomi Akano.

Strikeforce
On September 4, 2012, it was announced McMann had signed with Strikeforce. She was expected to debut at Strikeforce: Cormier vs. Mir against former bantamweight title challenger Liz Carmouche, but the event was cancelled.

Ultimate Fighting Championship
In February 2013, McMann officially joined the Ultimate Fighting Championship (UFC). It was rumored she turned down a fight with then-title holder Ronda Rousey. However, this was false information and no such fight was offered or even presented to McMann at the time. She became the third female to earn a victory in the UFC by defeating Sheila Gaff at UFC 159.

McMann was slated to face former Strikeforce champion Sarah Kaufman on August 28, 2013 at UFC Fight Night 27. However, McMann withdrew from the bout for, at the time, undisclosed personal reasons. In January 2015, she disclosed that the reason for withdrawing was due to her father battling aggressive lymphoma.

McMann faced Ronda Rousey for the UFC Women's Bantamweight Championship at UFC 170. She lost the fight by TKO after getting knocked down with a knee to the body. This stoppage created controversy, with many sports writers and attendants finding it premature.

McMann faced promotional newcomer Lauren Murphy at UFC Fight Night 47 on August 16, 2014. McMann won the fight by split decision.

McMann faced Miesha Tate at UFC 183 on January 31, 2015. Despite a strong first round, she lost by majority decision.

McMann faced Amanda Nunes on August 8, 2015 at UFC Fight Night 73. She lost the fight via submission in the first round.

McMann faced Jessica Eye at UFC Fight Night 88 on May 29, 2016. She won the fight via unanimous decision.

McMann faced Alexis Davis on December 3, 2016 at The Ultimate Fighter: Tournament of Champions. McMann won via submission in the second round.

McMann was expected to face Liz Carmouche at UFC Fight Night 105, on February 19, 2017. However, Carmouche was forced to pull out of the fight due to injury and will be replaced by newcomer Gina Mazany. McMann won the fight via submission early in the first round.

McMann was originally expected to face Ketlen Vieira at UFC 214 on July 29, 2017. However, the fight was moved to UFC 215.  She lost the bout via arm-triangle choke submission in the second round.

McMann faced Marion Reneau on February 24, 2018 at UFC on Fox 28. After dominating the first round, McMann was knocked down and submitted by Reneau in the second round.

After a year hiatus due to maternity leave, McMann was scheduled to face Nicco Montaño on July 13, 2019 at UFC on ESPN+ 13. However, McMann pulled out of the bout citing an injury in mid-June and was replaced by Julianna Peña.

McMann faced Lina Länsberg on January 25, 2020 at UFC Fight Night 166. She won the fight via unanimous decision.

McMann was scheduled to face Aspen Ladd on June 27, 2020 at UFC on ESPN: Poirier vs. Hooker. However, Ladd suffered a training injury, torn both her ACL and MCL and was forced to withdraw from the event.

McMann was expected to face Julianna Peña on January 16, 2021 at UFC on ABC 1 before being pushed back a week later to UFC 257 on January 24, 2021. McMann lost the fight via submission in round three.

McMann was scheduled to face Ketlen Vieira on August 28, 2021 at UFC on ESPN 30. However, McMann announced in mid August that a "reinjury" forced her out of the bout.

McMann faced Karol Rosa on March 26, 2022 at UFC on ESPN 33. She won the fight by unanimous decision.

McMann was scheduled to face Aspen Ladd  on August 13, 2022, at UFC on ESPN 41. However, Ladd was tested positive for COVID-19 and she was forced to withdraw from the event, and they were rescheduled for UFC Fight Night 210 on September 17.  At the weigh-ins, Ladd weighed in at 138 pounds, two pounds over the bantamweight non-title  fight limit. As a result the bout was scrapped.

The cancelled bout against Ladd was counted as her last bout of her contract and she was paid her show money, with McMann now being a free agent and exploring potential possibilities.

Bellator MMA 
On December 27, 2022, it was announced that McMann had signed with the Bellator MMA.

McMann is scheduled to make her promotional debut against Arlene Blencowe on April 21, 2023 at Bellator 294.

Personal life

McMann's parents are Paula Jean and Thomas William McMann. She has one sister, Nickolina, and had one brother, Jason.  Jason, who wrestled at Quince Orchard High School in Gaithersburg, Maryland, was murdered January 23, 1999 at the age of 21.

McMann attended McDowell High School in Marion, North Carolina where she was coached by Timothy Hutchins. In addition to wrestling, she participated in theatre productions. She earned a degree in Theatre at Lock Haven University of Pennsylvania in Lock Haven, Pennsylvania, where she was a member of the school's wrestling team under the coaching of Carl Poff from 1999 to 2003. She previously attended University of Minnesota Morris from 1998 to 1999, where she was coached by Doug Reese.

In August 2010, McMann was awarded an MA/EDS with a major in mental health counseling from Gardner-Webb University in Boiling Springs, North Carolina.

McMann does volunteer work for Habitat for Humanity, a Christian housing ministry. She traveled to Sri Lanka with Olympic teammates to help victims of the tsunami rebuild homes for those displaced by the tidal wave. She also helps with youth clubs and speaks to upcoming girls and boys about wrestling.

On September 3, 2004, while driving her Jeep in Colorado on the way to Iowa with her fiance, former ASU three-time NCAA All-American wrestler Steven Blackford as her passenger, the vehicle ran off the road and rolled over. He was ejected from the vehicle, and died at the scene. McMann was hospitalized with a broken arm and minor injuries, and later charged with careless driving.

McMann and her former training partner Trent Goodale have a daughter, Bella, who was born in 2009.

On May 30, 2018, McMann announced on social media that she and her partner Chad Bingham were expecting a child, and that she had put her career in mixed martial arts on hold. In December 2018, she announced that she had given birth to her son, Lucas.

World/Olympic matches

|-
!  Res.
!  Record
!  Opponent
!  Score
!  Date
!  Event
!  Location
!  Notes
|-
|Win
|13-10
|align=left| Lise LeGrand-Golliot
|style="font-size:88%"|2-1, 4-1
|style="font-size:88%"|2007-09-17
|style="font-size:88%"|2007 World Wrestling Championships
|style="text-align:left;font-size:88%;"| Baku, Azerbaijan
|style="text-align:left;font-size:88%;"| Bronze Medal
|-
|Win
|12-10
|align=left| Haiyan Xu
|style="font-size:88%"|Fall
|style="font-size:88%"|2007-09-17
|style="font-size:88%"|2007 World Wrestling Championships
|style="text-align:left;font-size:88%;"| Baku, Azerbaijan
|style="text-align:left;font-size:88%;"|
|-
|Win
|11-10
|align=left| Rojas Y Urbina
|style="font-size:88%"|Fall
|style="font-size:88%"|2007-09-17
|style="font-size:88%"|2007 World Wrestling Championships
|style="text-align:left;font-size:88%;"| Baku, Azerbaijan
|style="text-align:left;font-size:88%;"|
|-
|Loss
|10-10
|align=left| Kaori Icho
|style="font-size:88%"|1-2, 0-1
|style="font-size:88%"|2007-09-17
|style="font-size:88%"|2007 World Wrestling Championships
|style="text-align:left;font-size:88%;"| Baku, Azerbaijan
|style="text-align:left;font-size:88%;"|
|-
|Loss
|10-9
|align=left| Monika Rogien
|style="font-size:88%"|0-1, 1-2
|style="font-size:88%"|2006-09-25
|style="font-size:88%"|2006 World Wrestling Championships
|style="text-align:left;font-size:88%;"| Guangzhou, China
|style="text-align:left;font-size:88%;"|
|-
|Win
|10-8
|align=left| Sandra Amado
|style="font-size:88%"|1-0, 6-0
|style="font-size:88%"|2006-09-25
|style="font-size:88%"|2006 World Wrestling Championships
|style="text-align:left;font-size:88%;"| Guangzhou, China
|style="text-align:left;font-size:88%;"|
|-
|Win
|9-8
|align=left| Anna Polovneva
|style="font-size:88%"|1-2, 2-1, 4-2
|style="font-size:88%"|2005-10-02
|style="font-size:88%"|2005 World Wrestling Championships
|style="text-align:left;font-size:88%;"| Budapest, Hungary
|style="text-align:left;font-size:88%;"| Bronze Medal
|-
|Win
|8-8
|align=left| Helena Allandi
|style="font-size:88%"|2-5, 4-2, 2-2
|style="font-size:88%"|2005-10-02
|style="font-size:88%"|2005 World Wrestling Championships
|style="text-align:left;font-size:88%;"| Budapest, Hungary
|style="text-align:left;font-size:88%;"|
|-
|Loss
|7-8
|align=left| Kaori Icho
|style="font-size:88%"|3-2, 2-1
|style="font-size:88%"|2005-10-02
|style="font-size:88%"|2005 World Wrestling Championships
|style="text-align:left;font-size:88%;"| Budapest, Hungary
|style="text-align:left;font-size:88%;"|
|-
|Loss
|7-7
|align=left| Kaori Icho
|style="font-size:88%"|2-3
|style="font-size:88%"|2004-10-02
|style="font-size:88%"|2004 Olympic Games
|style="text-align:left;font-size:88%;"| Athens, Greece
|style="text-align:left;font-size:88%;"| Silver Medal
|-
|Win
|7-6
|align=left| Stavroula Zigouri
|style="font-size:88%"|Fall
|style="font-size:88%"|2004-10-02
|style="font-size:88%"|2004 Olympic Games
|style="text-align:left;font-size:88%;"| Athens, Greece
|style="text-align:left;font-size:88%;"|
|-
|Loss
|6-6
|align=left| Viola Yanik
|style="font-size:88%"|2-5
|style="font-size:88%"|2004-10-02
|style="font-size:88%"|2004 Olympic Games
|style="text-align:left;font-size:88%;"| Athens, Greece
|style="text-align:left;font-size:88%;"|
|-
|Win
|6-5
|align=left| Meng Lili
|style="font-size:88%"|Fall
|style="font-size:88%"|2004-10-02
|style="font-size:88%"|2004 Olympic Games
|style="text-align:left;font-size:88%;"| Athens, Greece
|style="text-align:left;font-size:88%;"|
|-
|Loss
|5-5
|align=left| Kaori Icho
|style="font-size:88%"|3-4
|style="font-size:88%"|2003-09-11
|style="font-size:88%"|2003 World Wrestling Championships
|style="text-align:left;font-size:88%;"| New York City, United States
|style="text-align:left;font-size:88%;"| Silver Medal
|-
|Win
|5-4
|align=left| Viola Yanik
|style="font-size:88%"|Fall
|style="font-size:88%"|2003-09-11
|style="font-size:88%"|2003 World Wrestling Championships
|style="text-align:left;font-size:88%;"| New York City, United States
|style="text-align:left;font-size:88%;"|
|-
|Win
|4-4
|align=left| Kristine Odrina
|style="font-size:88%"|11-0
|style="font-size:88%"|2003-09-11
|style="font-size:88%"|2003 World Wrestling Championships
|style="text-align:left;font-size:88%;"| New York City, United States
|style="text-align:left;font-size:88%;"|
|-
|Win
|3-4
|align=left| Sara Eriksson
|style="font-size:88%"|Fall
|style="font-size:88%"|2003-09-11
|style="font-size:88%"|2003 World Wrestling Championships
|style="text-align:left;font-size:88%;"| New York City, United States
|style="text-align:left;font-size:88%;"|
|-
|Loss
|2-4
|align=left| Kaori Icho
|style="font-size:88%"|Fall
|style="font-size:88%"|2002-11-01
|style="font-size:88%"|2002 World Wrestling Championships
|style="text-align:left;font-size:88%;"| Chalkida, Greece
|style="text-align:left;font-size:88%;"|
|-
|Win
|2-3
|align=left| Yoon So-Young
|style="font-size:88%"|11-0
|style="font-size:88%"|2002-11-01
|style="font-size:88%"|2002 World Wrestling Championships
|style="text-align:left;font-size:88%;"| Chalkida, Greece
|style="text-align:left;font-size:88%;"|
|-
|Loss
|1-3
|align=left| Meng Lili
|style="font-size:88%"|2-6
|style="font-size:88%"|2001-11-22
|style="font-size:88%"|2001 World Wrestling Championships
|style="text-align:left;font-size:88%;"| Sofia, Bulgaria
|style="text-align:left;font-size:88%;"|
|-
|Loss
|1-2
|align=left| Rena Iwama
|style="font-size:88%"|2-5
|style="font-size:88%"|2001-11-22
|style="font-size:88%"|2001 World Wrestling Championships
|style="text-align:left;font-size:88%;"| Sofia, Bulgaria
|style="text-align:left;font-size:88%;"|
|-
|Loss
|1-1
|align=left| Nikola Hartmann
|style="font-size:88%"|2-5
|style="font-size:88%"|2000-09-03
|style="font-size:88%"|2000 World Wrestling Championships
|style="text-align:left;font-size:88%;"| Sofia, Bulgaria
|style="text-align:left;font-size:88%;"|
|-
|win
|1-0
|align=left| Sofia Kampanari
|style="font-size:88%"|Fall
|style="font-size:88%"|2000-09-03
|style="font-size:88%"|2000 World Wrestling Championships
|style="text-align:left;font-size:88%;"| Sofia, Bulgaria
|style="text-align:left;font-size:88%;"|
|-

Championships and accomplishments

Mixed martial arts
Ultimate Fighting Championship
Performance of the Night (One time) 
 Invicta Fighting Championships
 Fight of the Night (One time)
 Women's MMA Awards
 2011 Mighty Mia Inspirational Fighter of the Year

Submission grappling
 ADCC Submission Wrestling World Championship
 2011 North American Championships Silver Medalist
 International Federation of Associated Wrestling Styles
 2009 FILA Grappling World Championships Senior Women's No-Gi Gold Medalist
 USA Wrestling
 FILA World Team Trials Senior Women's No-Gi 3rd Place (2009)
 North American Grappling Association
 2014 North American Championships Women's No-Gi Gold Medalist
 2011 North Carolina Championships Women's No-Gi Gold Medalist
 2010 Southeast Championships Women's No-Gi Gold Medalist
 2009 Southeast Championships Women's No-Gi Gold Medalist

Amateur wrestling
 International Olympic Committee
 2004 Summer Olympics Senior Women's Freestyle Silver Medalist
 International Federation of Associated Wrestling Styles
 2009 Sunkist Kids International Open Senior Women's Freestyle Gold Medalist
 2007 NYAC Holiday International Open Senior Women's Freestyle Silver Medalist
 2007 Sunkist Kids International Open Senior Women's Freestyle Gold Medalist
 2007 FILA Wrestling World Championships Senior Women's Freestyle Bronze Medalist
 2007 Warsaw Cup Senior Women's Freestyle Gold Medalist
 2007 Pan American Games Senior Women's Freestyle Gold Medalist
 2007 World Cup Senior Women's Freestyle Gold Medalist
 2007 Klippan Lady's Open Senior Women's Freestyle Gold Medalist
 2007 Dave Schultz Memorial International Open Senior Women's Freestyle Silver Medalist
 2006 World Cup Senior Women's Freestyle Bronze Medalist
 2005 FILA Wrestling World Championships Senior Women's Freestyle Bronze Medalist
 2004 Dave Schultz Memorial International Open Senior Women's Freestyle Bronze Medalist
 2004 Manitoba Open Senior Women's Freestyle Gold Medalist
 2004 FILA Olympic Test Tournament Senior Women's Freestyle Gold Medalist
 2003 NYAC Christmas International Open Senior Women's Freestyle Gold Medalist
 2003 Women's Championship Cup of Wrestling Senior Women's Freestyle Silver Medalist
 2003 Sunkist Kids International Open Senior Women's Freestyle Gold Medalist
 2003 World Cup Senior Women's Freestyle Silver Medalist
 2003 FILA Wrestling World Championships Senior Women's Freestyle Silver Medalist
 2003 Pan American Games Senior Women's Freestyle Gold Medalist
 2003 Klippan Lady's Open Senior Women's Freestyle Gold Medalist
 2003 Dave Schultz Memorial International Open Senior Women's Freestyle Gold Medalist
 2002 Henri Deglane Challenge Senior Women's Freestyle Gold Medalist
 2002 Yarygin Memorial International Senior Women's Freestyle Silver Medalist
 2002 Klippan Lady's Open Senior Women's Freestyle Gold Medalist
 2001 Sunkist Kids International Open Senior Women's Freestyle Gold Medalist
 2001 Pan American Championships Senior Women's Freestyle Gold Medalist
 2001 Dave Schultz Memorial International Open Senior Women's Freestyle Gold Medalist
 2001 Manitoba Open Senior Women's Freestyle Gold Medalist
 2000 Clansman International Open Senior Women's Freestyle Gold Medalist
 2000 Sunkist Kids International Open Senior Women's Freestyle Gold Medalist
 2000 Pan American Championships Senior Women's Freestyle Silver Medalist
 2000 Dave Schultz Memorial International Open Senior Women's Freestyle Gold Medalist
 USA Wrestling
 USA Senior Women's Freestyle Olympic Team Trials Winner (2004)
 USA Senior Women's Freestyle Olympic Team Trials Runner-up (2008)
 FILA Senior Women's Freestyle World Team Trials Winner (2000, 2001, 2002, 2003, 2005, 2006, 2007)
 FILA Junior Women's Freestyle World Team Trials Winner (1999, 2000)
 USA Senior Women's Freestyle National Championship (2000, 2002, 2003, 2005, 2006, 2007)
 USA Senior Women's Freestyle National Championship Runner-up (2004, 2008)
 USA University Women's Freestyle National Championship (2002)
 USA University Women's Freestyle National Championship Runner-up (1998)
 Northern Plains Senior Women's Freestyle Regional Championship (2008)
 2010 ASICS U.S. Open Wrestling Championships Senior Women's Freestyle Silver Medalist
 2006 Missouri Valley Showcase Senior Women's Freestyle Gold Medalist
 United States Girls' Wrestling Association
 USGWA High School National Championship (1998)

Mixed martial arts record

|-
|Win
|align=center|13–6
|Karol Rosa
|Decision (unanimous)
|UFC on ESPN: Blaydes vs. Daukaus
|
|align=center|3
|align=center|5:00
|Columbus, Ohio, United States
|
|-
|Loss
|align=center|12–6
|Julianna Peña
|Submission (rear-naked choke)
|UFC 257 
|
|align=center|3
|align=center|3:39
|Abu Dhabi, United Arab Emirates
|
|-
|Win
|align=center|12–5
|Lina Länsberg
|Decision (unanimous)
|UFC Fight Night: Blaydes vs. dos Santos 
|
|align=center|3
|align=center|5:00
|Raleigh, North Carolina, United States
|
|- 
|Loss
|align=center|11–5
|Marion Reneau
|Submission (triangle choke)
|UFC on Fox: Emmett vs. Stephens 
|
|align=center|2
|align=center|3:40
|Orlando, Florida, United States
|
|-
|Loss
|align=center|11–4
|Ketlen Vieira
|Submission (arm-triangle choke)
|UFC 215 
|
|align=center|2
|align=center|4:16
|Edmonton, Alberta, Canada
|
|-
|Win
|align=center|11–3
|Gina Mazany
|Submission (arm-triangle choke)
|UFC Fight Night: Lewis vs. Browne
|
|align=center|1
|align=center|1:14
|Halifax, Nova Scotia, Canada
|
|-
|Win
|align=center|10–3
|Alexis Davis
|Submission (arm-triangle choke)
|The Ultimate Fighter: Tournament of Champions Finale 
|
|align=center|2
|align=center|2:52
|Las Vegas, Nevada, United States
|
|-
|Win
|align=center|9–3
|Jessica Eye
|Decision (unanimous)
|UFC Fight Night: Almeida vs. Garbrandt
|
|align=center|3
|align=center|5:00
|Las Vegas, Nevada, United States
|
|-
| Loss
| align=center | 8–3
| Amanda Nunes
| Submission (rear-naked choke)
| UFC Fight Night: Teixeira vs. Saint Preux
| 
| align=center | 1
| align=center | 2:53
| Nashville, Tennessee, United States
|
|-
| Loss
| align=center | 8–2
| Miesha Tate
| Decision (majority)
| UFC 183
| 
| align=center | 3
| align=center | 5:00
| Las Vegas, Nevada, United States
|
|-
| Win
| align=center | 8–1
| Lauren Murphy
| Decision (split)
| UFC Fight Night: Bader vs. St. Preux
| 
| align=center | 3
| align=center | 5:00
| Bangor, Maine, United States
|
|-
| Loss
| align=center | 7–1
| Ronda Rousey
| TKO (knee to the body)
| UFC 170
| 
| align=center | 1
| align=center | 1:06
| Las Vegas, Nevada, United States
| 
|-
| Win
| align=center | 7–0
| Sheila Gaff
| TKO (punches)
| UFC 159
| 
| align=center | 1
| align=center | 4:06
| Newark, New Jersey, United States
|
|-
| Win
| align=center | 6–0
| Shayna Baszler
| Decision (unanimous)
| Invicta FC 2: Baszler vs. McMann
| 
| align=center | 3
| align=center | 5:00
| Kansas City, Kansas, United States
| 
|-
| Win
| align=center | 5–0
| Hitomi Akano
| Decision (unanimous)
| ProElite 3: Da Spyder vs. Minowaman
| 
| align=center | 3
| align=center | 5:00
| Honolulu, Hawaii, United States
|
|-
| Win
| align=center | 4–0
| Raquel Pa'aluhi
| Submission (americana)
| ProElite 1: Arlovski vs. Lopez
| 
| align=center | 3
| align=center | 2:53
| Honolulu, Hawaii, United States
|
|-
| Win
| align=center | 3–0
| Tonya Evinger
| Decision (unanimous)
| Titan Fighting Championships 19
| 
| align=center | 3
| align=center | 5:00
| Kansas City, Kansas, United States
|
|-
| Win
| align=center | 2–0
| Julie Malenfant
| Submission (punches)
| BlackEye Promotions 4
| 
| align=center | 1
| align=center | 0:32
| Fletcher, North Carolina, United States
|
|-
| Win
| align=center | 1–0
| Christina Marks
| Submission (rear-naked choke)
| Universal Cage Combat: Revolution
| 
| align=center | 1
| align=center | 1:41
| Lawrenceburg, Indiana, United States
|

See also
 List of current Bellator MMA fighters
 List of female mixed martial artists

References

External links
 
 
 

1980 births
American female sport wrestlers
Mixed martial artists from Maryland
American female mixed martial artists
Mixed martial artists utilizing freestyle wrestling
Living people
Lock Haven University of Pennsylvania alumni
Mixed martial artists from North Carolina
Olympic silver medalists for the United States in wrestling
People from Marion, North Carolina
People from Takoma Park, Maryland
Sportspeople from Maryland
University of Minnesota Morris alumni
Wrestlers at the 2004 Summer Olympics
Wrestlers at the 2007 Pan American Games
Gardner–Webb University alumni
Medalists at the 2004 Summer Olympics
Bantamweight mixed martial artists
World Wrestling Championships medalists
Pan American Games gold medalists for the United States
Pan American Games medalists in wrestling
Ultimate Fighting Championship female fighters
Medalists at the 2007 Pan American Games
21st-century American women